Melitara doddalis is a species of snout moth in the genus Melitara. It was described by Harrison Gray Dyar Jr. in 1925, and is found in the United States in southern Arizona, southern New Mexico, south-western Texas and in northern Mexico.

Adults are on wing from September to early October.

Pupation occurs on the ground during August and September.

Food sources
The larvae feed on Opuntia ficus-indica, Opuntia macrorhiza var. macrorhiza and Opuntia phaeacantha var. phaeacantha. They tunnel downward into the basal segments of the host plant. In 2020 a study found that M. doddalis is unselective as to which Opuntiae it chooses to feed upon.

Taxonomy
The species was previously considered a synonym of Melitara dentata.

References

Moths described in 1925
Phycitini